Pia Linz (born 1964) is a German artist and professor of drawing in painting at the Kunsthochschule Berlin-Weißensee. 

Her work is included in the collections of the National Gallery of Canada  and the Kunstmuseum Wolfsburg.

References

20th-century German women artists
21st-century German women artists
20th-century German artists
21st-century German artists
1964 births
Living people